Jack Palance (born Volodymyr Palahniuk; February 18, 1919 – November 10, 2006) was an American actor known for playing tough guys and villains. He was nominated for three Academy Awards, all for Best Actor in a Supporting Role, for his roles in Sudden Fear (1952) and Shane (1953), and winning almost 40 years later for City Slickers (1991).

Palance served in the United States Army Air Forces during World War II. He briefly attended Stanford University before pursuing a career in the theatre. He made his film acting debut in Panic in the Streets (1950). Following his roles in Sudden Fear and Shane, he starred as Count Dracula in the 1974 television film Bram Stoker's Dracula, and played crime lord Yves Perret in Tango & Cash (1989). He was also the host of the ABC television series Ripley's Believe It or Not! (1982–1986).

Early life
Palance was born in Lattimer Mines, Pennsylvania, the son of Anna (née Gramiak) and Ivan Palahniuk, an anthracite coal miner. His parents were Ukrainian immigrants, his father a native of Ivane-Zolote in southwestern Ukraine (modern Ternopil Oblast) and his mother from the Lviv Oblast. One of six children, he worked in coal mines during his youth before becoming a professional boxer in the late 1930s.

Boxing under the name Jack Brazzo, Palance lost his only recorded match, in a four-round decision on points, to future heavyweight contender Joe Baksi in a Pier-6 brawl (a colloquial term referring to an unsanctioned and particularly rough fight). Years later he recounted: "Then I thought, 'You must be nuts to get your head beat in for $200.' The theater seemed a lot more appealing."

College
Palance won a football scholarship to the University of North Carolina at Chapel Hill but left after two years, disgusted by commercialization of the sport.

World War II

With the outbreak of World War II, Palance's athletic career ended, and his career as a member of the United States Army Air Forces began. His face was said to have become disfigured while bailing out of a burning B-24 Liberator bomber during a training flight over Southern Arizona (where he was a student pilot). His distinctive cheekbones and deep-set eyes were said to have been the result of reconstructive surgery.

The story behind Palance's face was repeated numerous times (including in respected film reference works), but on his death, several obituaries quoted his saying that the entire story had been contrived: "Studio press agents make up anything they want to, and reporters go along with it. One flack created the legend that I had been blown up in an air crash during the war, and my face had to be put back together by way of plastic surgery. If it is a 'bionic face', why didn't they do a better job of it?"

Palance (Flight Officer Walter Polanski)  was honorably discharged from the United States Army Air Forces in September 1945. Shamokin News Dispatch, September 22, 1945.

Early acting career
After the war, he attended Stanford University, leaving just one credit shy of graduating in order to pursue a career in the theatre.

During his university years, he worked as a short order cook, waiter, soda jerk, lifeguard at Jones Beach State Park, and photographer's model.

His last name was actually a derivative of his original name. In an episode of What's My Line?, he described how no one could pronounce his last name, and how it was suggested that he be called Palanski. From that he decided just to use Palance instead.

A Streetcar Named Desire
Palance made his Broadway debut in 1947 as a Russian soldier in The Big Two, directed by Robert Montgomery.

His acting break came as Marlon Brando's understudy in A Streetcar Named Desire, and he eventually replaced Brando on stage as Stanley Kowalski. (Anthony Quinn, however, gained the opportunity to tour the play.)

Palance appeared in two plays in 1948 with short runs, A Temporary Island and The Vigil. He made his television debut in 1949.

Film career
Palance made his big-screen debut in Panic in the Streets (1950), directed by Elia Kazan, who had directed Streetcar on Broadway. He played a gangster, and was credited as "Walter (Jack) Palance".

That year he was featured in Halls of Montezuma (1951), about United States Marines during World War II. He returned to Broadway for Darkness at Noon (1951) by Sidney Kingsley, which was a minor hit.

Two Oscar nominations
Palance was second-billed in just his third film, opposite Joan Crawford in the thriller Sudden Fear (1952). His character is a former coal miner, as Palance's father had been. Palance received an Oscar nomination for Best Supporting Actor.

He was nominated in the same category the following year for his role as hired gunfighter Jack Wilson in Shane (1953). The film was a huge hit, and Palance was now an established film name.

Stardom
Palance played a villain in Second Chance opposite Robert Mitchum, and was an Indian in Arrowhead (both 1953). He got a chance to play a heroic role in Flight to Tangier (1953), a thriller.

He played the lead in Man in the Attic (1953), an adaptation of The Lodger. He was Attila the Hun in Sign of the Pagan with Jeff Chandler, and Simon Magus in the Ancient World epic The Silver Chalice (both 1954) with Paul Newman.

He had the star part in I Died a Thousand Times (1955), a remake of High Sierra, and was cast by Robert Aldrich in two star parts: The Big Knife (1955), from the play by Clifford Odets, as a Hollywood star; and Attack (1956), as a tough soldier in World War II.

In 1955 he had an operation for appendicitis.

Palance was in a Western, The Lonely Man (1957), playing the father of Anthony Perkins, and played a double role in House of Numbers (1957).

In 1957, Palance won an Emmy Award for best actor for his portrayal of Mountain McClintock in the Playhouse 90 production of Rod Serling's Requiem for a Heavyweight.

International star
Warwick Films hired Palance to play the hero in The Man Inside (1958), shot in Europe. He was reunited with Robert Aldrich and Jeff Chandler when they worked on Ten Seconds to Hell (1959), filmed in Germany, playing a bomb disposal expert.

He made Beyond All Limits (1959) in Mexico, and Austerlitz (1960) in France, then did a series of films in Italy: Revak the Rebel, Sword of the Conqueror, The Mongols, The Last Judgment, and Barabbas (all 1961), and Night Train to Milan and Warriors Five (both 1962).

Jean-Luc Godard persuaded Palance to take on the role of Hollywood producer Jeremy Prokosch in the nouvelle vague movie Le Mépris (1963) with Brigitte Bardot. Although the main dialogue was in French, Palance spoke mostly English.

Return to Hollywood
Palance returned to the U.S. to star in the TV series The Greatest Show on Earth (1963–64).

In 1964, his presence at a recently-integrated movie theatre in Tuscaloosa, Alabama, prompted a riot from segregationists who assumed Palance was there to promote civil rights.

He played a gangster in Once a Thief (1965) with Alain Delon. In the following year he appeared in the television film Alice Through the Looking Glass, directed by Alan Handley, in which he played the Jabberwock, and had a featured role opposite Lee Marvin and Burt Lancaster in the Western adventure The Professionals. Palance guest-starred in The Man from U.N.C.L.E., and the episodes were released as a film, The Spy in the Green Hat (1967).

He went to England to make Torture Garden (1967), and made Kill a Dragon (1968) in Hong Kong.

Palance provided narration for the 1967 documentary And Still Champion! The Story of Archie Moore. He was in the TV film The Strange Case of Dr. Jekyll and Mr. Hyde produced by Dan Curtis, during the making of which he fell and injured himself.

In 1969, Palance recorded a country music album in Nashville, released on Warner Bros. Records. It featured his self-penned song "The Meanest Guy that Ever Lived". The album was re-released on CD in 2003 by the Water label (Water 119).

His films tended to be international co-productions by now: They Came to Rob Las Vegas, The Mercenary (both 1968), The Desperados, and Marquis de Sade: Justine (both 1969).

Palance had a part in the Hollywood blockbuster Che! (1969) playing Fidel Castro opposite Omar Sharif in the title role, but the film flopped. Palance went back to action films and Westerns: Battle of the Commandos (1970), The McMasters (1970) and Compañeros (1970).

He had another role in Monte Walsh (1970), from the author of Shane, opposite Lee Marvin, but the film was a box-office disappointment. So too was The Horsemen (1971) with Sharif, directed by John Frankenheimer.

Palance supported Bud Spencer in It Can Be Done Amigo and Charles Bronson in Chato's Land (both 1972), and had the lead in Sting of the West (1972) and Brothers Blue (1973).

In Great Britain he appeared in a highly acclaimed TV film, Bram Stoker's Dracula (1973), in the title role; it was directed by Dan Curtis. Three years earlier, comic book artist Gene Colan had based his interpretation of Dracula for the acclaimed Marvel Comics comic book series The Tomb of Dracula on Palance, explaining, "He had that cadaverous look, a serpentine look on his face. I knew that Jack Palance would do the perfect Dracula."

Palance went back to Hollywood for Oklahoma Crude (1973) then to England to star in Craze (1975).

He starred in the television series Bronk between 1975 and 1976 for MGM Television, and starred in the TV films The Hatfields and the McCoys (1975) and The Four Deuces (1976).

Italy
In the late 1970s, Palance was mostly based in Italy. He supported Ursula Andress in Africa Express and L'Infermiera, Lee Van Cleef in God's Gun, and Thomas Milian in The Cop in Blue Jeans (all 1976).

Palance was in Black Cobra Woman; Safari Express, a sequel to Africa Express; Mister Scarface; and Blood and Bullets (all 1976). He travelled to Canada to make Welcome to Blood City (1977) and the US for The One Man Jury (1978), Portrait of a Hitman and Angels Revenge (both 1979).

Palance later said his Italian sojourn was the most enjoyable of his career. "In Italy, everyone on the set has a drinking cubicle, and no one is ever interested in working after lunch", he said. "That's a highly civilized way to make a movie."

Palance went back to Canada for H. G. Wells' The Shape of Things to Come (1979).

Return to the U.S. and Ripley's Believe It or Not!
In 1980, Jack Palance narrated the documentary The Strongest Man in the World by Canadian filmmaker Halya Kuchmij, about Mike Swistun, a circus strongman who had been a student of Houdini. Palance attended the premiere of the film on June 6, 1980, at the Winnipeg Art Gallery.

He appeared in The Ivory Ape (1980), Without Warning (1980), Hawk the Slayer (1980), and the slasher film, Alone in the Dark (1982).

In 1982, Palance began hosting a television revival of Ripley's Believe It or Not!. The weekly series ran from 1982 to 1986 on the American ABC network. The series also starred three different co-hosts from season to season, including Palance's daughter Holly Palance, actress Catherine Shirriff and singer Marie Osmond. Ripley's Believe It or Not! was in rerun syndication on the Sci-fi Channel (U.K.) and the Sci-fi Channel (U.S.) during the 1990s.

He appeared in the films Gor and Bagdad Café (both 1987).

Later career

Career revival

Palance had never been out of work since his career began, but his success on Ripley's Believe It or Not! and the international popularity of Bagdad Cafe (1987) created a new demand for his services in big-budget Hollywood films.

He made memorable appearances as villains in Young Guns (1988) as Lawrence Murphy, Tango & Cash (1989) and Tim Burton's Batman (1989). He also performed on Roger Waters' first solo album release, The Pros and Cons of Hitch Hiking (1984), and was in Outlaw of Gor (1988) and Solar Crisis (1990).

City Slickers
Palance was then cast as cowboy Curly Washburn in the 1991 comedy City Slickers. He quipped:
I don't go to California much any more. I live on a farm in Pennsylvania, about 100 miles from New York, so I can go into the city for dinner and a show when I want to. I also have a ranch about two hours from Los Angeles, but I don't go there very often at all...But I will always read a decent script when it is offered, and the script to City Slickers made sense. Curly (his character in the film) is the kind of man I would like to be. He is in control of himself, except for deciding the moment of his own death. Besides all that, I got paid pretty good money to make it.
Four decades after his film debut, Palance won an Academy Award for Best Supporting Actor on March 30, 1992, for his performance as Curly. Stepping onstage to accept the award, the 6' 4" (1.93 m) actor looked down at 5' 7" (1.70 m) Oscar host Billy Crystal (who was also his co-star in the movie) and joked, mimicking one of his lines from the film, "Billy Crystal ... I crap bigger than him." He then dropped to the floor and demonstrated his ability, at the age of 73, to perform one-armed push-ups.

The audience loved the moment as host Crystal turned it into a running gag. At various points in the broadcast, Crystal announced that Palance was "backstage on the StairMaster", had bungee-jumped off the Hollywood sign, had rendezvoused with the space shuttle in orbit, had fathered all the children in a production number, had been named People magazine's "Sexiest Man Alive", and had won the New York primary election. At the end of the broadcast Crystal said he wished he could be back next year, but "I've just been informed Jack Palance will be hosting."

Years later, Crystal appeared on Inside the Actors Studio and fondly recalled that, after the Oscar ceremony, Palance approached him during the reception: "He stopped me and put his arms out and went, 'Billy Crystal, who thought it would be you?' It was his really funny way of saying thank you to a little New York Jewy guy who got him the Oscars."

In 1993, during the opening of the Oscars, a spoof of that Oscar highlight featured Palance appearing to drag in an enormous Academy Award statuette with Crystal again hosting, riding on the rear end of it. Halfway across the stage, Palance dropped to the ground as if exhausted, but then performed several one-armed push-ups before regaining his feet and dragging the giant Oscar the rest of the way across the stage.

He appeared in Cyborg 2 (1993); Cops & Robbersons (1994) with Chevy Chase; City Slickers II: The Legend of Curly's Gold (1994); and on TV in Buffalo Girls (1995). He also voiced Rothbart in the 1994 animated film The Swan Princess.

Final years
Palance's final films included Ebenezer (1998), a TV Western version of Charles Dickens's classic A Christmas Carol, with Palance as Scrooge; Treasure Island (1999); Sarah, Plain and Tall: Winter's End (2000); and Prancer Returns (2001).

Palance, at the time chairman of the Hollywood Trident Foundation, walked out of a Russian Film Festival in Hollywood in 2004. After being introduced, Palance said, "I feel like I walked into the wrong room by mistake. I think that Russian film is interesting, but I have nothing to do with Russia or Russian film. My parents were born in Ukraine: I'm Ukrainian. I'm not Russian. So, excuse me, but I don't belong here. It's best if we leave." Palance was awarded the title of "People's Artist" by Vladimir Putin, president of Russia; however, Palance refused it.

In 2001, Palance returned to the recording studio as a special guest on friend Laurie Z's album Heart of the Holidays to narrate the classic poem "The Night Before Christmas".

In 2002, he starred in the television movie Living with the Dead opposite Ted Danson, Mary Steenburgen and Diane Ladd. In 2004, he starred in another television production, Back When We Were Grownups, opposite Blythe Danner; it was his final performance.

Personal life

Palance lived for several years around Tehachapi, California.

He was married to his first wife, Virginia (née Baker), from 1949 to 1968. They had three children: Holly, Brooke, and Cody. On New Year's Day, 2003, Virginia was struck and killed by a car in Los Angeles.

Palance's daughter Brooke married Michael Wilding, son of Michael Wilding Sr. and Elizabeth Taylor; they have three children. Cody Palance, also an actor, appeared alongside his father in the films God's Gun and Young Guns.

In May 1987, Palance married his second wife, Elaine Rogers.

Palance painted and sold landscape art, with a poem included on the back of each picture. He was also the author of The Forest of Love, a book of poems published in 1996 by Summerhouse Press. He was a supporter of the Republican Party.

Palance acknowledged a lifelong attachment to his Pennsylvania heritage, and visited there when able. Shortly before his death, he sold his farm in Butler Township and put his art collection up for auction.

Novelist Chuck Palahniuk, author of Fight Club and other works, acknowledged in a 2007 interview that he was a distant nephew of Palance.

Death
Palance died on November 10, 2006 at his daughter Holly's home in Montecito, California, at age 87.

Legacy
Palance has a star on the Hollywood Walk of Fame at 6608 Hollywood Boulevard.

In 1992, he was inducted into the Western Performers Hall of Fame at the National Cowboy & Western Heritage Museum in Oklahoma City, Oklahoma.

According to writer Mark Evanier, comic book creator Jack Kirby modeled his character Darkseid on the actor.

The Lucky Luke 1956 comic Lucky Luke contre Phil Defer by Morris features a villain named Phil Defer who is a caricature of Jack Palance.

The song "And now we dance" by punk band The Vandals features the lyrics, "Come on and do one hand pushups just like Jack Palance."

American comedian Bill Hicks incorporated a reference to Palance in one of his most famous routines, likening Palance's character in Shane to how he views the United States' role in international warfare.

Novelist Donald E. Westlake stated that he sometimes imagined Palance as the model for the career-criminal character Parker he wrote in a series of novels under the name Richard Stark.

Filmography

Television movies/miniseries

Television series

Awards and nominations

Discography
 Palance, Warner Bros, 1969

References

External links

 
 
 
 

1919 births
2006 deaths
American male boxers
American male film actors
American male stage actors
American male television actors
Best Supporting Actor Academy Award winners
Best Supporting Actor Golden Globe (film) winners
Boxers from Pennsylvania
Outstanding Performance by a Lead Actor in a Miniseries or Movie Primetime Emmy Award winners
Male actors from Pennsylvania
People from Luzerne County, Pennsylvania
American people of Polish descent
American people of Ukrainian descent
Male Western (genre) film actors
Stanford University alumni
United States Army Air Forces pilots of World War II
20th-century American male actors
21st-century American male actors
California Republicans
Pennsylvania Republicans
Military personnel from Pennsylvania